Upper Radstowe was a fictional place used by the novelist E. H. Young.

It was based on Clifton, a fashionable inner district of the city of Bristol in South West England.

Upper Radstowe was the setting for seven novels:
The Misses Mallett (1922)
William (1925)
Miss Mole (1930)
Jenny Wren (1932)
The Curate’s Wife (1934)
Celia (1937)
Chatterton Square (1947)

References

Fictional populated places in England
Clifton, Bristol